The New York Mets Radio Network, referred to on air as the WCBS Mets Radio Network, was a radio network owned by Audacy, Inc. (previously CBS Radio) that broadcast New York Mets baseball games. It consisted of 14 stations (12 AM, 2 FM and 1 FM translator) in the states of Connecticut, Florida, New Jersey, and New York. A Spanish-language broadcast airs separately from the English-language network.

The network's English-language flagship was WCBS, which acquired the radio rights to the Mets during the 2018 offseason in a new seven year deal with what was then Entercom to air their games on the station beginning in 2019 and running through 2025. The Mets had previously aired their games on WFAN since the station was founded in 1987, and factoring in the station's predecessors the relationship dated back to 1983. The relationship with WFAN ended following the 2013 season when the station acquired the radio rights to the New York Yankees from corporate sibling WCBS. WOR acquired the radio rights to the Mets during the 2013 offseason; the move made the team the first professional team since the now-Brooklyn Nets to air its games on WOR; the Nets, along with their then-arenamates the New Jersey Devils, were picked up by WFAN following the station's loss of broadcast rights for the New York Knicks and New York Rangers in 2004. With the move to WCBS, the relationship between WFAN and the Mets was repaired, with WFAN employees again allowed to appear on Mets broadcasts. WEPN is the Spanish-language flagship.

Howie Rose serves as play-by-play and color commentator on the broadcasts, alternating these roles with another broadcaster. Most recently this was Josh Lewin, who called games alongside Rose from 2012-2018. Wayne Randazzo replaced Lewin as co play-by-play commentator and serves as post-game host. Ed Coleman previously hosted the pre-game and post-game shows, which were called Mets Extra by WFAN, and served as a substitute broadcaster when necessary (usually for Lewin, who, in addition to his Mets duties, was the radio voice of the San Diego Chargers and was forced to miss weekend games in September in order to fulfill those duties). However, in January 2014 it was announced that Coleman would not be part of the WOR broadcasts as he has been employed by WFAN since its inception. (Although WFAN personalities Chris Carlin and Marc Malusis have been heard on WOR through its broadcasts of Rutgers University sporting events, WOR does not produce Rutgers' games and is instead an affiliate of its radio network.) Coleman returned to the Mets' booth as pre-game host in 2019

On April 1, 2019, Entercom announced that it had discontinued the Mets' radio network and would be carrying games only on WCBS for the 2019 season. The Mets cited the loss of some of its affiliates prior to the season (among them WROW in Albany) and the relative expense of satellite space for the discontinuation. At least one station, WTLA in Syracuse (the city that houses the Mets' AAA affiliate), expressed objection to the cancellation, as that station had an affiliation deal that ran through 2020 and will not be honored. WCBS, a maximum-power clear-channel station that can be received in most of the Eastern United States at night, now exclusively airs all games.

On March 31, 2022, the Mets announced that the WCBS stream on the Audacy app would stream Mets games in full to make up for the radio network's shortfall throughout the Mets' home territory, and also be made available on the team's website under the same restriction. The team and Audacy will also produce and stream the team's Spanish-language broadcast, which will return to WEPN after a one-year interregnum on TelevisaUnivision's WQBU-FM (a sale of that station to a religious broadcaster required a move in rights over the offseason).

Flagships (2 stations)
880/WCBS: New York City (2019–)
1050/WEPN: New York City (2022–, Spanish language)

Affiliate (1 station)

Florida (1 station)
1590/WPSL: Port St Lucie, Florida

Former flagships (18 stations)

570/WMCA: New York City (1978-1982)
620/WSKQ: Jersey City, New Jersey (1990-1996)
660/WFAN: New York City (1988-2013)
710/WOR: New York City (2014-2018)
770/WABC: New York City (1962 & 1963)
970/WJRZ: Hackensack (1967-1971)
1050/WHN: New York City (1964-1966, 1972-1974, 1983-1987)
1050/WFAN: New York City (1987-1988)
1050/WEPN: New York City (2013-2020)
1130/WNEW: New York City (1975-1977)
1280/WADO: New York City (1997-2009)1380/WBNX: New York City (1982-August 31, 1984)
1380/WKDM: New York City (September 1, 1984-1986)
1480/WHOM: New York City (1962-1974)
1480/WJIT: New York City (1987-1989)
92.7/WQBU-FM: Garden City, New York (Spanish flagship) (2010-2012, 2021)
101.9/WFAN-FM: New York City (2013)
VENE International Network (1975-1981)

Former affiliates (13 stations + 2 translators)
590/WROW: Albany, New York (2018)
800/WLAD: Danbury, Connecticut (-2018)
980/WOFX: Troy, New York (-2018)
1120/WKAJ: Oneonta, New York (-2018)
1200/WTLA: North Syracuse, New York (-2018)
1230/WMML: Glens Falls, New York
1300/WAVZ: New Haven, Connecticut (-2018)
1310/WSGO: Oswego, New York
1450/WKIP: Poughkeepsie, New York
1490/WCSS: Amsterdam, New York (-2018)
94.1/W231DJ: Danbury (translator for WLAD)
96.9/W245BA: Manorville (translator for WLIR-FM)
102.5/WBAZ: Watermill, Long Island (-2018)
104.9/WINU: Altamont, New York (2015-2017)
107.1/WLIR-FM: Hampton Bays, New York (was supposed to be an affiliate in 2014, however its format reverted to religion.)

See also
List of XM Satellite Radio channels
List of Sirius Satellite Radio stations
List of New York Mets broadcasters

References

New York Mets

Major League Baseball on the radio
Sports radio networks in the United States